Line 4 of Ningbo Rail Transit is a rapid transit line in Ningbo. It starts from Cicheng Town, Jiangbei District, and ends near Dongqian Lake in Yinzhou District. The project was approved on November 5, 2013 and opened on December 23, 2020. Construction of Line 4 started in 2011 with the groundbreaking of the North Ring Elevated Expressway with the second deck of the structure being used for Line 4 trains. The rest of the line started construction on November 30, 2015.

Route 
Line 4 starts from Cicheng Station in Cicheng Town in east-west direction as an elevated line. Then it turns south into the North Outer Ring Expressway where it turns east-west running under the elevated expressway forming a three level structure similar to the northern section of Shanghai Metro Line 1. After reaching Jiangbei Avenue, it starts to turn underground and deviates from the viaduct to Zhuangqiao Railway Station where it turns south, crosses Yaojiang River and reaches Ningbo Railway Station. Then Line 4 goes along Changchun Road, Xingning Road until it reaches Canghai Road and become north-south again. After reaching Shounan Road it turns into southeast direction and reaches Dongqian Lake, its destination.

Stations

References 

04
Railway lines opened in 2020
2020 establishments in China

1500 V DC railway electrification